The San Diego Jewish Film Festival (SDJFF) is an annual eleven-day-long film festival held in San Diego, California. Established in 1990, the festival is managed by the San Diego Center for Jewish Culture, at the Lawrence Family Jewish Community Center in La Jolla. The festival usually consists of around fifty narrative, documentary, and short films, often with post-film audience discussions with the filmmakers. The San Diego Jewish Film Festival "aims to educate and illuminate audiences by offering an array of films that depict elements of the Jewish life, history, and culture in challenging, moving, and humorous ways as never seen before." As of 2020, the festival had been operating for 30 years.

"The mission of the San Diego Jewish Film Festival is to offer outstanding world cinema that promotes awareness, appreciation and pride in the diversity of the Jewish people to attendees of the community at large. Festival programs aim to educate and illuminate through evocative, independent fiction and documentary films that portray the Jewish experience from current to historic global perspectives."

The festival draws more than 40,000 ticket holders at five theaters throughout San Diego County: AMC La Jolla 12 Theatres, Carlsbad Village Theater. San Marcos Edwards Stadium 18, and the David and Dorothea Garfield Theater.

Hitting a landmark 25th Silver Anniversary year in 2015, the San Diego Jewish Film Festival currently shows over 48 feature films, 40 short films, and 20 special guests.

See also
San Francisco Jewish Film Festival
Tampa Bay Jewish Film Festival

References

External links
San Diego Jewish Film Festival official website

Film festivals in San Diego
Jewish film festivals in the United States
Jews and Judaism in San Diego
1990 establishments in California